Global Trance Network is the German parent label of several smaller labels including d.Drum, Liquid Audio Soundz, Sector, and Velvet Inc.

It is a sublabel of Nova Tekk Records.

Some of the best-known psychedelic trance artists has releases on GTN, including X-Dream and Koxbox.

Also a trance radio show "Global Trance" with Brett James and DJ Contagious.

See also
 List of record labels

German record labels
Psychedelic trance record labels